Benedetto Lomellini (1517 – 24 July 1579) was an Italian Roman Catholic cardinal and bishop.

Biography
Benedetto Lomellini was born in Genoa in 1517, the son of a rich noble family. He received a doctorate in law.

He practiced as a lawyer and became a cleric in Genoa.  He later moved to Rome, becoming a Referendary of the Apostolic Signatura.  On 27 September 1543 he became an abbreviator de parco maiori.  He was made a secretary apostolic on 1 December 1551.  The pope also made him a domestic prelate.  On 27 July 1562 he became a member of the Apostolic Camera.  He was made praefectus annonae on 13 November 1562.  He accompanied Cardinal Carlo Carafa during his legation to Philip II of Spain.

Pope Pius IV made him a cardinal deacon in the consistory of 12 March 1565.  He received the red hat and the deaconry of Santa Maria in Aquiro on 15 May 1565.

On 6 July 1565 he was elected Bishop of Ventimiglia.  He was transferred to the see of Luni-Sarzana on 7 September 1565.  On the same day, he opted for the titular church of Santa Sabina.  He was consecrated as a bishop by Cardinal Clemente d'Olera in San Pietro in Montorio on 21 November 1565.

He participated in the papal conclave of 1565-66 that elected Pope Pius V.  The new pope named him papal legate in the Campagne and Maritime Province in 1571.  On 17 March 1572 he was transferred to the see of Anagni.  He participated in the papal conclave of 1572 that elected Pope Gregory XIII.

He died in Rome on 24 July 1579.  He was buried in San Gregorio Magno al Celio.

References

1517 births
1579 deaths
16th-century Italian cardinals
16th-century Italian Roman Catholic bishops
16th-century Italian jurists